Samuel F. Williams (March 9, 1931 – April 25, 2013) was an American football defensive end in the National Football League (NFL). He was a 24th round selection (288th overall pick) of the Los Angeles Rams in the 1956 NFL Draft out of Michigan State University. Williams played for the Rams (1959), the Detroit Lions (1960–1965), and the Atlanta Falcons (1966–1967). He died in Livonia, Michigan, after a short illness.

References

1931 births
2013 deaths
American football defensive ends
Atlanta Falcons players
Detroit Lions players
Los Angeles Rams players
Michigan State Spartans football players
All-American college football players
People from Dansville, Michigan
Players of American football from Michigan